Maria Cristina Correnti (born 21 November 1972, in Messina, Italy) is an Italian former basketball player.

References

1972 births
Living people
Italian women's basketball players
Sportspeople from Messina
20th-century Italian women
21st-century Italian women